TESE or Tase may refer to:

Acronyms
 2-hydroxyhexa-2,4-dienoate hydratase, an enzyme encoded by the tesE gene
 Testicular sperm extraction, a surgical procedure to remove sperm from a testis
 Thorn-EMI Screen Entertainment, former name of British EMI Films

Other uses
 Tese language, an Eastern Sudanic language
 teše, a verb stem in the morphological classification of Czech verbs